Miguel Bento Martins da Costa Macedo e Silva (b. Braga, 6 June 1959) is a Portuguese lawyer, politician, and a former Minister of Internal Administration.

He received his degree in law from the University of Coimbra.

Political career 
Miguel Macedo was the leader of JSD, the youth wing of PSD. His first experience in the government was in the first cabinet of Aníbal Cavaco Silva as Junior Secretary of State of Minister Couto dos Santos between 1990 and 1991. Afterwards he became active in local politics and was elected city councilor of Braga, from 1993 to 1997. In 2002, he returned to national politics with the PSD as State Secretary of Justice under Minister Celeste Cardona and Minister José Pedro Aguiar-Branco. He was the Deputy of Braga from 1987 to 2002, and again from 2005 onwards.

When Pedro Passos Coelho was elected president of PSD, Miguel Macedo was elected leader of Parliament. His negative vote for the approval of the Programa de Estabilidade e Crescimento [Stability and Growth Programme] (PEC) of the current president at that time, José Sócrates, meant the fall of his government and the call for early elections.

On 16 November 2014, he announced his resignation following a series of corruption allegations and investigations into some of his business and ministerial partners, regarding the attribution of golden visas. In February of 2017, the trial regarding those accusations began. In January 2019, Miguel Macedo was acquitted from all the accusations.

References 

1959 births
Living people
Ministers of Internal Affairs by country
Government ministers of Portugal
20th-century Portuguese lawyers